This page lists the rosters of the UCI Women's Team –  – sorted by season.

2016

2015
As of 10 March 2015. Ages as of 1 January 2015.

2013
As of 1 January 2013

2012
Ages as of 1 January 2012.

2011
Ages as of 1 January 2011.

References

Lists of cyclists by team